Joshua Joseph Thomson (born September 21, 1977) is an American mixed martial arts podcaster, commentator, analyst and former mixed martial artist. A professional competitor since 2001, Thomson has competed in Bellator MMA, PRIDE, Strikeforce, UFC, the World Fighting Alliance, and appeared at Dynamite!! 2010. Thomson is a former Strikeforce World Lightweight Champion, former Strikeforce U.S. Lightweight Champion, and a former top contender in the UFC.

Background
Thomson was born and raised in San Jose, California, growing up in the east side of the city. Being half-European-American and half-Mexican, Thomson faced discrimination and got into fights often. In middle school, he was involved in a brawl in which the principal was punched while trying to break up the incident, resulting in Thomson being placed in a juvenile hall. Afterwards, Thomson went to live with his father in Idaho where he went to high school and competed in wrestling. Thomson continued wrestling at junior college powerhouse, North Idaho Community College, and also trained with the wrestling team at Stanford University before deciding school was not for him. His college wrestling record was 40–3. In 2000, Thomson was involved in an alcohol-fueled brawl while on a lake cruise in Idaho. In the melee Thomson choked one man so badly that he required CPR and as a result, Thomson was charged with felony aggravated assault, serving six months of a three-year sentence before being released for good behavior.

Mixed martial arts career
Thomson started out very strongly in his MMA career winning his first two professional bouts, before going to a no contest with Norifumi Yamamoto. Thomson would then go on to win his next three fights, including a win over former WEC Lightweight Champion Rob McCullough.

Ultimate Fighting Championship
Thomson made his debut in the UFC at UFC 44 defeating Gerald Strebendt by knockout in the first round. He would then pick up a decision victory over Hermes Franca in an incredible fight at UFC 46, before falling victim in his next fight to a highlight reel knockout finish at the hands of Yves Edwards.

Strikeforce
Thomson went 2-1 in the UFC before leaving and opting instead to go overseas to Japan and fight for PRIDE FC. He won his sole fight in PRIDE by submission in the first round. Thomson then signed with Strikeforce and made his debut against Clay Guida in a title fight for the vacant Strikeforce Lightweight Championship losing by unanimous decision. Thomson would go on to win his next six fights, including victories over Duane Ludwig and Nam Phan earning him another shot at the Strikeforce Lightweight Championship.

On June 27, 2008, he defeated Gilbert Melendez by unanimous decision at Strikeforce: Melendez vs. Thomson to become the new Strikeforce Lightweight Champion.

On November 21, 2008, Thomson was scheduled to make his first title defense in a rematch against Yves Edwards at Strikeforce: Destruction but had to pull out after tearing ligaments in his toe. Duane Ludwig was selected to take Thomson's place on the card. On April 11, 2009, Thomson was scheduled to make his first title defense in a rematch against Gilbert Melendez at Strikeforce's debut on the Showtime Network, but had to pull out after breaking his ankle while training on April 1, 2009. Rodrigo Damm was selected to take Thomson's place on the card.

On August 15, 2009, Thomson was scheduled to unify his title with the newly crowned Strikeforce Interim Lightweight Champion Gilbert Melendez at Strikeforce: Carano vs. Cyborg, but suffered a broken leg in training. Mitsuhiro Ishida was selected to take Thomson's place against Melendez.

On December 19, 2009 at Strikeforce: Evolution, Thomson fought Gilbert Melendez for the Lightweight Championship. Thomson would lose the fight by unanimous decision, but the fight would see both fighters put it all on the line in what would prove to be a very fast-paced and exciting fight.

Thomson fought Pat Healy at Strikeforce: Fedor vs. Werdum and won by rear naked choke late in the 3rd round. After this win, Dave Camarillo granted him his black belt in Guerrilla jiu-jitsu. Thomson broke two ribs during the fight on Healy's very first takedown and fought the rest of the fight very defensively.

Thomson fought Gesias Cavalcante on October 9, 2010 at Strikeforce: San Jose where he won a controversial unanimous decision (29–28, 29–28, and 30–27).

Thomson's next fight was against Tatsuya Kawajiri under the co-promoted DREAM, K-1 end of year event Dynamite!! 2010.  He lost the fight via unanimous decision.

Thomson was expected to face promotional newcomer Maximo Blanco at Strikeforce World Grand Prix: Barnett vs. Kharitonov but yet another foot injury forced him out of the bout.

Thomson returned in March 2012 to face K. J. Noons at Strikeforce: Tate vs. Rousey.  He won the fight via unanimous decision.

The trilogy rematch between Thomson and Gilbert Melendez for the Strikeforce Lightweight Championship took place at Strikeforce: Barnett vs. Cormier on May 19, 2012, with Thomson losing the fight via split decision.

Return to the UFC
Following the dissolution of Strikeforce in January 2013, Thomson returned to the UFC and faced Nate Diaz on April 20, 2013 at UFC on Fox 7. He won the fight via TKO (head kick and punches), becoming the first of only two fighters to date to finish Diaz by way of strikes. The win also earned him his first Knockout of the Night bonus award.

Thomson was expected to face current UFC Lightweight Champion Anthony Pettis on December 14, 2013 at UFC on Fox 9, replacing an injured T. J. Grant,  However, the bout was cancelled after Pettis pulled out of the bout citing a knee injury.

Thomson faced Benson Henderson on January 25, 2014 in the main event at UFC on Fox 10. Henderson defeated Thomson via split decision. Many media outlets and observers were split on who they thought should have been declared the winner.  Thomson had one more takedown (5 to 4) and was able to secure Henderson's back on multiple occasions, while Henderson was able to significantly outstrike Thomson (114 to 33) over the duration of the bout and was credited with the bout's only submission attempt.  During the first round Thomson broke the thumb on his right hand, contributing to his inability to punch with much effectiveness.  Disappointed in the result of the Henderson bout, Thomson indicated in the post-fight press conference, that he may be "done" with the UFC or fighting.

Thomson was expected to face Michael Johnson on July 26, 2014 at UFC on Fox 12. However, on July 11, Johnson pulled out of the bout due to injury and was replaced by Bobby Green. Thomson lost the bout via split decision.

Thomson was expected to face Gilbert Burns on March 21, 2015 at UFC Fight Night 62. However, on February 26, Thomson pulled out of the fight with an undisclosed injury, while Burns remained on the card against a replacement.

Thomson faced Tony Ferguson at UFC Fight Night: Mir vs. Duffee on July 15, 2015. He lost the fight via unanimous decision. Thomson's contract ended after his bout with Ferguson and he opted not to re-sign with the UFC.

Bellator MMA
On August 11, 2015, Thomson signed a multi-fight contract with Bellator MMA. He made his debut on September 19, 2015 at Bellator MMA & Glory: Dynamite 1 against Mike Bronzoulis, winning via submission in the third round.

In his second fight for the promotion, Thomson faced Pablo Villaseca on December 4, 2015 at Bellator 147. He won the fight via TKO in the second round.

In his third fight for Bellator MMA Thomson faced Patricky Pitbull in the main event at Bellator 172. He lost the fight via knockout in the second round.

On January 28, 2020, Thomson announced his retirement from mixed martial arts.

Personal life
Before becoming a full-time professional fighter, Thomson worked in construction.

Thomson now runs and co-hosts the popular MMA and combat sports podcast "Weighing In" with legendary former MMA referee "Big" John McCarthy.

Thomson made his acting debut in Fist of the Dragon (2014).

Championships and accomplishments
Strikeforce
Strikeforce Lightweight Championship (One time)
Strikeforce U.S. Lightweight Championship (One time)
One successful title defense
Ultimate Fighting Championship
Knockout of the Night (One time) 
Sports Illustrated
2009 Round of the Year vs. Gilbert Melendez on December 19; Round 5

Mixed martial arts record

|-
| Loss
| align=center| 22–9 (1)
| Patricky Pitbull
| KO (punch)
| Bellator 172
| 
| align=center|2
| align=center|0:40
| San Jose, California, United States 
|
|-
| Win
| align=center| 22–8 (1)
| Pablo Villaseca
| TKO (punches)
| Bellator 147
| 
| align=center|2
| align=center|3:59
| San Jose, California, United States 
|
|-
| Win
| align=center| 21–8 (1)
| Mike Bronzoulis
| Submission (arm-triangle choke)
| Bellator 142: Dynamite 1
| 
| align=center| 3
| align=center| 0:39
| San Jose, California, United States
| 
|-
| Loss
| align=center| 20–8 (1)
| Tony Ferguson
| Decision (unanimous)
| UFC Fight Night: Mir vs. Duffee
| 
| align=center| 3
| align=center| 5:00
| San Diego, California, United States
|
|-
| Loss
| align=center| 20–7 (1)
| Bobby Green
| Decision (split)
| UFC on Fox: Lawler vs. Brown
| 
| align=center| 3
| align=center| 5:00
| San Jose, California, United States
| 
|-
| Loss
| align=center| 20–6 (1)
| Benson Henderson
| Decision (split)
| UFC on Fox: Henderson vs. Thomson
| 
| align=center| 5
| align=center| 5:00
| Chicago, Illinois, United States
| 
|-
| Win
| align=center| 20–5 (1)
| Nate Diaz
| TKO (head kick and punches)
| UFC on Fox: Henderson vs. Melendez
| 
| align=center| 2
| align=center| 3:44
| San Jose, California, United States
| 
|-
| Loss
| align=center| 19–5 (1)
| Gilbert Melendez
| Decision (split)
| Strikeforce: Barnett vs. Cormier
| 
| align=center| 5
| align=center| 5:00
| San Jose, California, United States
| 
|-
| Win
| align=center| 19–4 (1)
| K. J. Noons
| Decision (unanimous)
| Strikeforce: Tate vs. Rousey
| 
| align=center| 3
| align=center| 5:00
| Columbus, Ohio, United States
|  
|-
| Loss
| align=center| 18–4 (1)
| Tatsuya Kawajiri
| Decision (unanimous)
| Dynamite!! 2010
| 
| align=center| 3
| align=center| 5:00
| Saitama, Japan
| 
|-
| Win
| align=center| 18–3 (1)
| Gesias Cavalcante
| Decision (unanimous)
| Strikeforce: Diaz vs. Noons II
| 
| align=center| 3
| align=center| 5:00
| San Jose, California, United States
| 
|-
| Win
| align=center| 17–3 (1)
| Pat Healy
| Submission (rear-naked choke)
| Strikeforce: Fedor vs. Werdum
| 
| align=center| 3
| align=center| 4:27
| San Jose, California, United States
| 
|-
| Loss
| align=center| 16–3 (1)
| Gilbert Melendez
| Decision (unanimous)
| Strikeforce: Evolution
| 
| align=center| 5
| align=center| 5:00
| San Jose, California, United States
| 
|-
| Win
| align=center| 16–2 (1)
| Ashe Bowman
| TKO (punches)
| Strikeforce: At The Mansion II
| 
| align=center| 1
| align=center| 1:14
| Beverly Hills, California, United States
| 
|-
| Win
| align=center| 15–2 (1)
| Gilbert Melendez
| Decision (unanimous)
| Strikeforce: Melendez vs. Thomson
| 
| align=center| 5
| align=center| 5:00
| San Jose, California, United States
| 
|-
| Win
| align=center| 14–2 (1)
| Adam Lynn
| KO (punches)
| Strikeforce: Playboy Mansion
| 
| align=center| 1
| align=center| 4:45
| Beverly Hills, California, United States
| 
|-
| Win
| align=center| 13–2 (1)
| Nick Gonzalez
| Submission (rear-naked choke)
| Strikeforce: Shamrock vs. Baroni
| 
| align=center| 1
| align=center| 1:42
| San Jose, California, United States
| 
|-
| Win
| align=center| 12–2 (1)
| Nam Phan
| Decision (unanimous)
| Strikeforce: Triple Threat
| 
| align=center| 3
| align=center| 5:00
| San Jose, California, United States
| 
|-
| Win
| align=center| 11–2 (1)
| Duane Ludwig
| Submission (guillotine choke)
| Strikeforce: Tank vs. Buentello
| 
| align=center| 2
| align=center| 4:36
| Fresno, California, United States
| 
|-
| Win
| align=center| 10–2 (1)
| Rocky Johnson
| Submission (armbar)
| Pride and Fury 5
| 
| align=center| 1
| align=center| 1:55
| Worley, Idaho, United States
| 
|-
| Win
| align=center| 9–2 (1)
| Harris Sarmiento
| Submission (arm-triangle choke)
| Strikeforce: Revenge
| 
| align=center| 3
| align=center| 3:19
| San Jose, California, United States
| 
|-
| Loss
| align=center| 8–2 (1)
| Clay Guida
| Decision (unanimous)
| Strikeforce: Shamrock vs. Gracie
| 
| align=center| 5
| align=center| 5:00
| San Jose, California, United States
| 
|-
| Win
| align=center| 8–1 (1)
| Daisuke Sugie
| Submission (kneebar)
| PRIDE Bushido 8
| 
| align=center| 1
| align=center| 2:35
| Nagoya, Japan
| 
|-
| Loss
| align=center| 7–1 (1)
| Yves Edwards
| KO (flying head kick and punches)
| UFC 49
| 
| align=center| 1
| align=center| 4:32
| Las Vegas, Nevada, United States
| 
|-
| Win
| align=center| 7–0 (1)
| Hermes França
| Decision (unanimous)
| UFC 46
| 
| align=center| 3
| align=center| 5:00
| Las Vegas, Nevada, United States
| 
|-
| Win
| align=center| 6–0 (1)
| Gerald Strebendt
| KO (punches)
| UFC 44
| 
| align=center| 1
| align=center| 2:45
| Las Vegas, Nevada, United States
| 
|-
| Win
| align=center| 5–0 (1)
| Rob McCullough
| Decision (unanimous)
| WFA 3: Level 3
| 
| align=center| 3
| align=center| 5:00
| Las Vegas, Nevada, United States
| 
|-
| Win
| align=center| 4–0 (1)
| Kajan Johnson
| TKO (submission to elbows)
| SE: North American Sport Fighting Invitational
| 
| align=center| 2
| align=center| 4:56
| Boise, Idaho, United States
| 
|-
| Win
| align=center| 3–0 (1)
| Doug Evans
| Submission (triangle choke)
| NW Submission Fighting 1
| 
| align=center| 1
| align=center| 1:29
| Boise, Idaho, United States
| 
|-
| NC
| align=center| 2–0 (1)
| Norifumi Yamamoto
| NC (groin kick) 
| Shogun 1
| 
| align=center| 2
| align=center| 2:00
| Honolulu, Hawaii, United States
| 
|-
| Win
| align=center| 2–0
| Víctor Estrada
| Submission (triangle choke)
| Gladiators Vale Tudo
| 
| align=center| 2
| align=center| N/A
| Worley, Idaho, United States
| 
|-
| Win
| align=center| 1–0
| Jason Abajian
| KO (punches)
| Bushido 1
| 
| align=center| 1
| align=center| N/A
| Tempe, Arizona, United States
|

Filmography

See also
 List of current UFC fighters
 List of male mixed martial artists

References

External links
 
 
 

American male mixed martial artists
American mixed martial artists of Mexican descent
Mixed martial artists from California
Lightweight mixed martial artists
Mixed martial artists utilizing collegiate wrestling
Mixed martial artists utilizing Brazilian jiu-jitsu
Strikeforce (mixed martial arts) champions
Ultimate Fighting Championship male fighters
American male sport wrestlers
Amateur wrestlers
American practitioners of Brazilian jiu-jitsu
People awarded a black belt in Brazilian jiu-jitsu
Living people
1978 births